Giuliana Fumagalli is a Canadian politician, who was elected to Montreal City Council in the 2017 municipal election. A past member of Projet Montréal, she currently sits as a member of Quartiers Montréal and serves as the borough mayor of Villeray–Saint-Michel–Parc-Extension. In the 2021 Montreal municipal election, Fumagalli was defeated by Laurence Lavigne Lalonde.

References

Living people
Montreal city councillors
Mayors of places in Quebec
Women mayors of places in Quebec
People from Villeray–Saint-Michel–Parc-Extension
21st-century Canadian politicians
21st-century Canadian women politicians
Year of birth missing (living people)